The 1976 Hamilton Tiger-Cats season was the 19th season for the team in the Canadian Football League and their 27th overall. The Tiger-Cats finished in 2nd place in the Eastern Conference with an 8–8 record but lost the Eastern Final to the Ottawa Rough Riders.

Regular season

Season standings

Season schedule

Post-season

Awards and honours
CFL's Coach of the Year – Bob Shaw
John Barrow was elected as a Player into the Canadian Football Hall of Fame August 5, 1976.

CFL All-Stars
Jimmy Edwards, Running Back
Lewis Porter, Defensive Back
David Shaw, Defensive Back

References

Hamilton Tiger-cats Season, 1976
Hamilton Tiger-Cats seasons
1976 Canadian Football League season by team